The 2019–20 Pittsburgh Panthers men's basketball team represented the University of Pittsburgh during the 2019–20 NCAA Division I men's basketball season. The Panthers were led by second-year head coach Jeff Capel and played their home games at the Petersen Events Center in Pittsburgh, Pennsylvania as members of the Atlantic Coast Conference.

The Panthers finished the season 16–17, and 6–14 in ACC play.  They defeated to Wake Forest in the first round of the ACC tournament before losing to NC State in the second round.  The tournament was cancelled before the Quarterfinals due to the COVID-19 pandemic.  The NCAA tournament and NIT were also cancelled due to the pandemic.

Previous season
The Panthers finished the 2018–19 season 14–19 overall and 3–15 in ACC play, finishing fourteenth in the conference.  The Panthers defeated Boston College in the first round of the ACC tournament but lost to Syracuse in the second round.

Offseason

Departures

Incoming transfers

2019 recruiting class

2020 recruiting class

Roster

}

}

Schedule and results

Source:

|-
!colspan=9 style=| Exhibition

|-
!colspan=9 style=| Regular season

|-
!colspan=9 style=| ACC tournament

References

Pittsburgh Panthers men's basketball seasons
Pittsburgh
Pittsburgh
Pittsburgh